Beckham Reef Wheeler-Greenall (born 3 June 2002) is a New Zealand cricketer. He is an all-rounder, bowling right-arm offspin. He represented New Zealand in the 2020 Under-19 Cricket World Cup, finishing the tournament as his team's second-highest run-scorer, but failed to take any wickets. He made his domestic T20 debut for the Otago Volts against Auckland Aces at John Davies Oval in Queenstown on 29 December 2021.

References 

2002 births
Living people
New Zealand cricketers
Otago cricketers